Mylene Balan Paat (born April 5, 1994) is a Filipino professional volleyball player. She currently plays for Nakhon Ratchasima of the Women's Volleyball Thailand League. She also represents the Philippines women's national volleyball team. At the collegiate level, she played for the Adamson Lady Falcons indoor volleyball and beach volleyball teams.

Early life
Mylene Paat was raised in Luac, Bani, Pangasinan, to parents Dante G. Paat and Ligaya B. Paat. Mylene has 4 siblings.

Career

2013-2014

Mylene Paat debut as a rookie of Adamson Women's Volleyball team on the year 2013-2014 wherein the UAAP Season 76 is being held. It is a good start for her in the UAAP as their team defeated the Lady Tamaraws of the Far Eastern University in the Fourth-seed play-offs. Due to the Lady Spikers of De La Salle University sweeping all the games in the preliminary round, they we're given 1 of the 2 tickets into the finals. It was also decided that the 1 ticket left into the final games will be granted to the team who will win the stepladder round. The team was then challenge by the strong team of Lady Eagles who finish in 3rd place on the preliminary rounds, making a quick work of Adamson in 3 sets, leaving them behind and settle for a 4th-place finish.

2014-2015

Mylene is definitely making a huge impact for the Lady Falcons. She was then seen as one of the top performers of Adamson who has helped a lot for the team. As the UAAP Season 77 women's volleyball started, the Falcons was tested in a very high note as they first saw action against the champions of De La Salle University Lady Spikers and against the runner-up team of the Lady Eagles. The Adamson Falcons can't see more adjustments as the Lady Spikers finish them in 3-1 and Lady Eagles in 3-0 sets. The Lady Falcons was then determined to show what they have and what they can do as they defeated the Lady Warriors of the University of the East in a 3 straight sets with Paat scoring double digit of 16 points. The momentum for Adamson continued as they also defeated the Lady Tigresses and Tamaraws but the Lady Maroons and Bulldogs stopped the momentum giving the Adamson Falcons the bleeding. It the final elimination rankings, the Lady Falcons was trailing by 1 win against UST and FEU who settled for the fourth-place play-offs. The team who finished in 4th last season falls in the 7th place making a disappointment on the face of their head coach during their last game.

2015-2016
The team first face the Lady Tigresses of the University of Santo Tomas. The games lasted in 5 sets with Paat finishing the game with a good hit of the ball. The team also defeated the Lady Tamaraws and Lady Warriors only in the first round making Adamson's current coach Sherwin Meneses decide to leave the team as he said on an interview that maybe it would be better to leave them for them to learn and make some adjustments and make him as an inspiration to their future volleyball team. The Lady Falcons saw their team was fully trailing behind finishing winless in the second round of the preliminary and finishing the season with a record of 3 wins and 11 losses maintaining the 7th place that they've settled last season.

Mylene was about to join the U23 National Women's Volleyball team of the Philippines but her alma mater of Adamson University blocked her from joining as the university doesn't like any of their line-ups and specially key players will not be injured.

2016-2017
Mylene Paat forego her final playing year on Adamson as she had struggled to lead her team. It was then revealed on late September 2016 that the professional women's club team of Cignal HD Spikers  recruited her on their team to boost up their morale on the upcoming PSL Super Liga Grand Prix which kicks off on October 8. The team then started their campaign on the league wherein they finished 3rd in the preliminary round. They then played against the Petron Blaze Spikers in the semi-finals round but the team fells short making them settle for the 3rd place. The team then faced the team who finished 1st in the preliminary rounds which is Philips Gold Lady Slammers but it was all then the same result, they trail from behind. The team ended the season in 4th-place ranking higher against two teams who finished 5th and 6th respectively.

2017-2018

On the first day of the month of May 2017, Mylene alongside teammate Janine Marciano represented Cignal on the 2017 PSL Beach Volleyball Challenge Cup. The duo finish 6th in the cup.

On July 1, 2017, current head coach of the Adamson Lady Falcons reported that Mylene Paat will be back for the last time on the UAAP to help the team on their campaign after the team finish last in the previous season. With the help of Mylene and the other seniors of the San Marcelino squad, they managed to finish 5th in the standings, a spot away from their final four contention.

On April 17, 2018, Mylene returned to the PSL to join Cignal in their campaign in the semis. She and her team did not make it and ended up finishing 6th.

Paat returned to the sands once again to represent Cignal on the 2018 PSL Beach Volleyball Challenge Cup. She was paired with a new partner, Raprap Aguilar. The duo also finish 6th, same with Mylene and Janine's placing on the previous cup last year.

After several trials on the national team, it was revealed on June 13 that Mylene made it to the cut of the Philippines women's national volleyball team's Top 20. A day later, the national head coach of the team revealed the Top 14 players who will banner the country at the 2018 Asian Women's Club Volleyball Championship. Though Mylene did not make it to the cut, she is still eligible to prove herself to make it to the next cut of the Top 14 of the other international competitions later this year.

On July 7, Mylene along with the other members of the National Team played against Cocolife Asset Managers. It was a straight set win for the team with Paat playing on the opposite position for the whole game.

Clubs
 Cignal HD Spikers (2016–2020)
 Chery Tiggo Crossovers (2020–present)
 Nakhon Ratchasima (2021–2022)

Awards

Individual
 2018 PSL All-Filipino Conference "Best Scorer"
 2021–22 Thailand League "Best Scorer"
 2022 PVL Reinforced Conference "Conference Most Valuable Player"
 2022 PVL Reinforced Conference "Best Opposite Spiker"

Clubs
 2017 PSL Invitational Cup –  Champion, with Cignal HD Spikers
 2017 PSL All-Filipino Conference –  Bronze medal, with Cignal HD Spikers
 2021 Premier Volleyball League Open Conference –  Champion, with Chery Tiggo 7 Pro Crossovers
 2021 PNVF Champions League (Women) –  Silver medal, with Chery Tiggo 7 Pro Crossovers
 2021–2022 Thailand League –  Bronze medal, with Nakhon Ratchasima

References

Filipino women's volleyball players
1994 births
University Athletic Association of the Philippines volleyball players
Adamson University alumni
Living people
Opposite hitters
Volleyball players at the 2018 Asian Games
Competitors at the 2019 Southeast Asian Games
Asian Games competitors for the Philippines
Filipino expatriate sportspeople in Thailand
Expatriate volleyball players in Thailand
Competitors at the 2021 Southeast Asian Games
Southeast Asian Games competitors for the Philippines
21st-century Filipino women